The Dokshitzer–Gribov–Lipatov–Altarelli–Parisi (DGLAP) evolution equations are equations in QCD describing the variation of parton distribution functions with varying energy scales. Experimentally observed scaling violation in deep inelastic scattering is important evidence for the correctness of the equations and of QCD in general. The equations were first published in the western world by Guido Altarelli and Giorgio Parisi in 1977, and so are still sometimes called the Altarelli–Parisi equations.

The DGLAP QCD evolution equations are widely used in global determinations of parton distributions, like those from the CTEQ or NNPDF collaborations.

See also
 Jet (particle physics)
 HERA
 APFEL (Software)

References

Further reading

External links
 Guido Altarelli (2009) QCD evolution equations for parton densities. Scholarpedia, 4(1):7124.

Quantum chromodynamics